Lecythiocrinus is an extinct genus of sea lily belonging to the order Cyathocrinida and family Codiacrinidae. Species of this genus have been found in Pennsylvanian beds in Australia and North America.

References 

Paleozoic echinoderms
Cladida